Lachenalia nordenstamii is a species of plant in the family Asparagaceae. The name is accepted by some authorities, but  not by the World Checklist of Selected Plant Families. It is endemic to Namibia.  Its natural habitat is rocky areas.

References

 

Flora of Namibia
nordenstamii
Least concern plants
Taxonomy articles created by Polbot